The Dow Tennis Classic or Dow Corning Tennis Classic (DCTC) is a WTA 125 level tennis tournament. It is played in October–November each year in Midland, Michigan. From 2010 to 2020, it used to be held as a $100,000 tournament as part of the ITF Women's Circuit before being upgraded to a WTA 125 event in 2021.

Past finals

Singles

Doubles

References

External links
 Official website